E. E. Smith High School (also Ezekiel Ezra Smith High School, E.E.S.,  Smith High, Smith) is a high school in Fayetteville, North Carolina. A part of Cumberland County Schools, it is named for Ezekiel Ezra Smith and is home of the Golden Bulls.

High school aged dependents of personnel living on the military reservation of Fort Bragg, in Cumberland County, are zoned to E. E. Smith.

History

Ezekiel Ezra Smith High School has been home of the Mighty Golden Bulls since 1927.

The school has been in four different locations: Orange Street, Campbell Avenue, Washington Drive, and Seabrook Rd (Present Location).  From 1927 to 1929, the Orange Street School served as the high school. The school was moved to the building on Campbell Avenue in September 1929. At that time, the school was known as the Southside High School. This building was used until 1932. In September 1932, the school was rehoused in the building on Orange Street, remaining there until January 1940. A new modern edifice was built on Washington Drive in 1941. This building served students until June 1954.

In 1954, the current physical facility was erected and made ready for occupancy on September 6, 1954. This building with its beautiful and functional architecture occupies a site of twenty-eight acres.  In 1932, the Fayetteville Grade School Trustees held a special meeting and voted unanimously to name the school in honor of the distinguished educator, clergyman and U.S. Ambassador, Ezekiel Ezra Smith, a man who left a legacy of unusually fine and constructive work.  Hereafter, the school was officially designated E. E. Smith High School, trusting that the standards of the school would always be kept worthy of the name which was bestowed upon it.

To date the school has had eleven principals: Benjamin Lay, W.C. Donnell, A. J. Blackburn, E. E. Miller, W. T. Brown, John R. Griffin, Jr., Lonnie McAllister, Rene' Corders, Clinton Robinson, Melody Chalmers, Donell Underdue and the current principal Larry Parker.

Today, the school plant consists of approximately 50 classrooms, housing foreign languages, science and computer labs, offices, a guidance suite, library, auditorium, music rooms, 2 gymnasiums, cafeteria, music building and a physical education building.

The D.T. Carter Athletic Field which seats approximately 5,000 persons, has a quarter mile track, and facilities for other field events. There are also six tennis courts.

Notable alumni

 Glenn B. Adams, lawyer and Fayetteville City Councilman
 Charlie Baggett, former NFL coach and college football coach
 Robert Brickey, basketball coach
 Harold Floyd "Tina" Brooks, hard bop, blues, funk tenor saxophonist and composer
 Aaron Curry, NFL linebacker
 Mark Allen Davis, jurist and NC Supreme Court Judge
 Russell Davis, NFL defensive tackle and Super Bowl XLII champion with the New York Giants
 Bishop Harris, former college football coach and NFL coach
 Joe Harris, NFL linebacker and member of Georgia Tech Hall of Fame
 Patricia D. Horoho,  retired U.S Army Lieutenant General and was 43rd U.S. Army Surgeon General and Commanding General of the U.S. Army Medical Command. The first female and first Nurse Corps Officer to hold those appointments.
Brian Tyree Henry, best known for his role as "Paper Boi" in the FX series Atlanta, also played in other major acting and voice roles, including Jefferson Davis in the movie Spider-man: Into the Spider-verse
 Jason Hunter, NFL defensive end
 Lil' Mo (Cynthia Karen Loving),  R&B singer, radio personality, songwriter, and record producer
 Connell Maynor, college football head coach
 Mary E. McAllister, Democratic member of the North Carolina General Assembly representing the 43rd House district
 Anquell McCollum, former professional basketball player and college coach
 Victoria "Porkchop" Parker, drag performer
 Jimmy Raye II, former NFL player and current coach
 Larry Tearry, NFL center
 Cressie Thigpen, lawyer and jurist who served on the North Carolina Court of Appeals
 Tank Tyler, NFL defensive tackle
 Dimitrius Underwood, NFL defensive end
 Doug Wilkerson, NFL offensive lineman and 3x Pro Bowl selection

References

External links
 

Historically segregated African-American schools in North Carolina
Educational institutions established in 1927
Schools in Cumberland County, North Carolina
1927 establishments in North Carolina